

2 is the tenth overall and fifth North American studio album by the a cappella group Rockapella. As the name suggests, it was the group's second CD released through a record company in the United States. It was recorded during the fall of 1999 and released in the spring of 2000. In 2004, the album was then re-released on Shakariki Records with two new remixes of "This Isn't Love," which replace the  Folgers Coffee commercial tracks "Rockin' Morning" and "Holiday Wake-Up."

Track listing

2004 re-issue

Personnel
Scott Leonard – high tenor
Kevin Wright – tenor
Elliott Kerman – baritone
Barry Carl – bass
Jeff Thacher – vocal percussion

References

2000 albums
Rockapella albums